The 2012 Alberta Scotties Tournament of Hearts, Alberta's women's provincial curling championship, was held from January 25 to 29 at the Leduc Curling Club in Leduc, Alberta. The winning team of Heather Nedohin, represented Alberta at the 2012 Scotties Tournament of Hearts in Red Deer, Alberta, where they finished round robin with a 7-4 record, which was enough to finish 4th place and clinch a spot in the playoffs. The team would go on to win both the 3-4 game and the semi-final. They would face British Columbia in the final, where for the first time in fourteen years, Alberta would win the Scotties.

Qualification Process
Twelve teams will qualify for the provincial tournament through several berths. The qualification process is as follows:

Teams

* McRorie replaced Bronwen Webster, who is pregnant and sitting out the rest of the season.

Draw Brackets

A Event

B Event

C Event

Results

Draw 1
January 25, 9:30 AM MT

Draw 2
January 25, 6:30 PM MT

Draw 3
January 26, 9:00 AM MT

Draw 4
January 26, 2:00 PM MT

Draw 5
January 26, 6:30 PM MT

A Final
January 26, 6:30 PM MT

Draw 6
January 27, 9:00 AM MT

Draw 7
January 27, 2:00 PM MT

Draw 8
January 27, 6:30 PM MT

B Final
January 27, 6:30 PM MT

C Final 1
January 28, 1:00 PM MT

C Final 2
January 28, 1:00 PM MT

Playoffs

A1 vs. B1
January 28, 6:30 PM MT

C1 vs. C2
January 28, 6:30 PM MT

Semifinal
January 29, 9:30 AM MT

Final
January 29, 2:00 PM MT

Qualifying Events

Northern Qualification
The Northern Qualification for the 2012 Alberta Scotties Tournament of Hearts took place from January 6 to 8 at the Thistle Curling Club in Edmonton. The event qualified three teams to the provincial playdowns.

Teams

* Appleman withdrew from the competition but was included in the event. Each team scheduled against Appleman received a bye to the next draw.

Results

A Event

B Event

C Event

Southern Qualification
The Southern Qualification for the 2012 Alberta Scotties Tournament of Hearts took place from January 6 to 9 at the Airdrie Curling Club in Airdrie. The event qualified three teams to the provincial playdowns.

Teams

A Event

B Event

C Event

References

Alberta
Scotties Tournament of Hearts
Alberta Scotties Tournament of Hearts
Leduc, Alberta
Curling in Alberta